Michael Moore is an American filmmaker and author.

Michael Moore may also refer to:

Academia 
 Michael G. Moore (fl. 1970s–2020s), professor of education
 Michael S. Moore (academic) (fl. 1960s–2020s), American law professor
 Michael Moore (herbalist) (1941–2009), author, founder of the SW School of Botanical Medicine and expert on medicinal plants
 Michael Moore (physicist) (born 1943), professor of theoretical physics since 1976 at the University of Manchester
 Michael Moore (provost) (c. 1639–1723), Irish priest, philosopher and educationalist

Entertainment 
 Mickey Moore or Michael D. Moore (1914–2013), Canadian-born American film director and child actor
 Michael Moore (bassist) (born 1945), American bassist
 Michael Moore (saxophonist and clarinetist) (born 1954), American musician
 Michael S. Moore (comics) (born 1974), American comic book writer

Politics 
 Michael Moore (Maryland politician) (died 1903), American politician
 Mike Moore (New Zealand politician) (1949–2020), former Prime Minister of New Zealand and former Director-General of the World Trade Organization
 Michael W. Moore (born 1948), former Secretary of the Florida Department of Corrections
 Michael Moore (Australian politician) (born 1950), former member of the Australian Capital Territory Legislative Assembly
 Mike Moore (American politician) (born 1952), former Mississippi attorney-general, known for his involvement with early tobacco litigation
 Michael Moore (Scottish politician) (born 1965), Liberal Democrat politician in the UK, former Secretary of State for Scotland
 Michael J. Moore (born 1968), former state senator and United States Attorney for the Middle District of Georgia
 Michael Moore (judge) (fl. 1990s–2000s), former Federal Court of Australia justice
 Michael O. Moore (fl. 2000s–2020s), Massachusetts Senator from Millbury, Massachusetts, representing the Second Worcester District

Sports

Baseball
 Henry W. Moore or Mike Moore (1876–1917), Negro leagues baseball player
 Mike Moore (baseball) (born 1959), Major League Baseball player
 Mike Moore (baseball executive) (fl. 1960s–2000s), Minor League Baseball president

Football
 Mick Moore (born 1952), English footballer
 Mike Moore (running back) (1956–2016), college football player
 Michael Moore (offensive lineman) (born 1976), former American football guard
 Michael Moore (footballer) (born 1981), Scottish football player
 Mike Moore (American football coach) (fl. 1980s–2010s), American football coach
 Mike Moore (Canadian football) (born 1993), Canadian football player

Other sports
 Mike Moore (wrestler) (born 1958), former WCW professional wrestler
 Michael Moore (rowing) (born 1970), American Olympic rower
 Mikki Moore (born 1975), NBA player for the Golden State Warriors
 Mike Moore (ice hockey) (born 1984), ice hockey player
 Mike Moore (basketball) (born 1994), American basketball player

Other people 
 Michael Moore (Swedish officer) (born 1953), major-general in Swedish Air Force, and expert at Swedish Department of Defense
 Michael Scott Moore (born 1969), American journalist and novelist
 Michael D. Moore (evangelist) (fl. 1980s–2020s), pastor of the Faith Chapel Christian Center in Birmingham, Alabama
 Michel Moore (born 1960), Chief of Los Angeles Police Department